WLVF-FM (90.3 FM) is a radio station broadcasting a Southern Gospel format. Licensed to Haines City, Florida, United States, the station is currently owned by the Landmark Baptist Church.

History
The station was assigned the call letters WHGS on February 12, 1986;  it went on the air April 11, 1986. On August 1, 1990, the station changed its call sign to the current WLVF-FM.

WLVF-FM was previously simulcast on WLVF (930 AM), which relinquished its license and went off the air in 2011.

Programs
In addition to live broadcasts of services at Landmark Baptist Church, the schedule includes reruns of Lester Roloff, Unshackled! produced by Pacific Garden Mission, and Canada's People's Gospel Hour with speaker Perry Rockwood.

References

External links

Radio stations established in 1986
1986 establishments in Florida
Southern Gospel radio stations in the United States
LVF-FM